Kim Taplin (born 1943) is an English poet and non-fiction writer. She studied English at Somerville College, University of Oxford.

Work
Taplin has published several collections of poetry, and non-fiction works.  The English Path was noted in the British Council's "Best books" in 1984, and Tongues in Trees: Studies in Literature and Ecology was reviewed in Poetry Review in 1990. Her 1993 work Three Women in a Boat retraces the journey of Jerome K. Jerome's Three Men in a Boat. She has written several articles for Resurgence magazine.

Her poem "Trying for truth" was included in a 1991 collection Elected friends: poems for and about Edward Thomas.

Publications

 The English Path (1979, Boydell Press ; 2nd ed 1999,Perry Green Press)
 Muniments (1987, Jackson's Arm)
 Tongues in Trees: Studies in literature and ecology (1989, Green Books)
By the Harbour Wall (1990, Enitharmon Press)
Three Women in a Boat (1993, Impact Books)
Journeywork : writing from the Whitehill workshops (editor; 1997)
For People with Bodies (1997, Flarestack)
From Parched Creek (2001, Redbeck)
 Snow Buntings at Barton Point (2006, Sixties Press)
 Walking aloud : rambles in the Cherwell Valley  (2008, Wychwood Press)
Days off in Oxfordshire (2011, Wychwood Press)

References

1943 births
Living people
English women poets
Alumni of Somerville College, Oxford